Samuel Marks Solomon (February 21, 1915 – July 13, 1960), known professionally as Mark Scott, was an American actor and broadcaster. He is probably best known for hosting the Home Run Derby television show that originally aired in 1960.

Biography
Scott was a native of Chicago and a graduate of the University of Illinois. As an actor, he had minor roles in television series such as Dragnet and Boston Blackie and in movies such as Hell's Horizon and -30-. He was an announcer in 1956 for the Cincinnati Redlegs of Major League Baseball and in 1957 for the Hollywood Stars of the Pacific Coast League, which transferred out of the city after that season due to the arrival of the Los Angeles Dodgers.

As host of the Home Run Derby show in 1960, Scott both announced the action and interviewed each batter while the batter's opponent was hitting. His most well known line from the show was, "It's a home run or nothing here on Home Run Derby." He died of a heart attack in Burbank, California, shortly after the first season of the show aired. Rather than find a replacement for him, the producers decided to cancel the series. Scott was also developing a celebrity golf show with the working title of Back Nine at the time of his death. He was survived by his wife and three children.

References

Further reading

External links
 

1915 births
1960 deaths
20th-century American male actors
American game show hosts
American male television actors
American sports announcers
Cincinnati Reds announcers
Major League Baseball broadcasters
Male actors from Chicago
Minor League Baseball broadcasters
National Football League announcers
University of Illinois alumni